Joseph Jefferson McDowell (November 13, 1800 – January 17, 1877) was an American lawyer and politician who served as two-term a U.S. Representative from Ohio from 1843 to 1847. He was the son of Joseph McDowell, a prominent North Carolina politician who served in the Revolutionary War and was also a member of Congress.

Biography
Born in Burke (now McDowell) County, North Carolina, McDowell moved to Kentucky with his mother in 1805 and to Augusta County, Virginia, in 1817.
He pursued preparatory studies.
He engaged in agricultural pursuits.
He moved to Highland County, Ohio, in 1824 and continued agricultural pursuits.
He moved to Hillsboro, Highland County, in 1829 and engaged in mercantile pursuits.

Political and military career 
He served as member of the State house of representatives in 1832.
He served in the State senate in 1833.

He was appointed brigadier general of the State militia in 1834.
He studied law.
He was admitted to the bar in 1835 and commenced the practice of his profession in Hillsboro, Ohio.
He was an unsuccessful candidate for election in 1840 to the Twenty-seventh Congress.
Ohio Presidential elector in 1832 for Andrew Jackson.

Congress 
McDowell was elected as a Democrat to the Twenty-eighth and Twenty-ninth Congresses (March 4, 1843 – March 3, 1847).
He served as chairman of the Committee on Accounts (Twenty-eighth Congress).

Later career and death 
He resumed the practice of law and also engaged in agricultural pursuits.
He died in Hillsboro, Ohio, January 17, 1877.
He was interred in Hillsboro Cemetery.

Sources

External links
 

1800 births
1877 deaths
People from McDowell County, North Carolina
People from Highland County, Ohio
1832 United States presidential electors
Ohio lawyers
Democratic Party Ohio state senators
Democratic Party members of the Ohio House of Representatives
19th-century American politicians
People from Hillsboro, Ohio
19th-century American lawyers
Democratic Party members of the United States House of Representatives from Ohio